Raja Umrao Singh Bhati, also known as Rao Umrao Singh, was a notable Hindu Gurjar King of Dadri princely state during the Indian Rebellion of 1857. The leader of the rebellion Bahadur Shah Zafar appointed the Nawab Walidad Khan of Mala-garh and Umrao Singh as the leader of Upper Doab (modern day western U.P). He successfully led a band of armed soldiers against the British troops at the coast of the Hindon River on 30th and 31st may and was able to bring back the rule that previously existed. He was the chief organiser of the fight against the British in Dadri, Bulandshahr and
Gautam Budh Nagar.He and his family members were captured later by the Britishers on 26 September 1857 and then he was crushed by the elephants.

References

Revolutionaries of the Indian Rebellion of 1857
Year of birth missing
1857 deaths
People from Gautam Buddh Nagar district